Wilkinson House may refer to:

in the United States

Clyde Wilkinson House, Challis, Idaho, listed on the National Register of Historic Places (NRHP) in Custer County, Idaho
Wilkinson House (Muncie, Indiana), designed by Leslie Ayres
Thomas C. Wilkinson House, Davenport, Iowa, listed on the NRHP in Scott County, Iowa
Winston Wilkinson House, Liberty, Mississippi, listed on the NRHP in Amite County, Mississippi 
Jemima Wilkinson House, Jerusalem, New York, listed on the NRHP in Yates County, New York
Wilkinson House (Poughkeepsie, New York), listed on the National Register of Historic Places in Dutchess County, New York
Wilkinson-Dozier House, Conetoe, North Carolina, listed on the NRHP in Edgecombe County, North Carolina]]
Goodwin-Wilkinson Farmhouse, Warrenton, Oregon, listed on the NRHP in Clatsop County, Oregon
Wilkinson House (University of Oregon)
Wilkinson House (Pocopson Twp., Pennsylvania), listed on the National Register of Historic Places in Chester County, Pennsylvania
Wilkinson-Boineau House, Adams Run, South Carolina, listed on the NRHP in Charleston County, South Carolina
Wilkinson House (Joelton, Tennessee), listed on the National Register of Historic Places in Davidson County, Tennessee
Wilkinson-Keele House, Manchester, Tennessee, listed on the NRHP in Coffee County, Tennessee 
Wilkinson-Hawkinson House, Park City, Utah, listed on the NRHP in Summit County, Utah